William Wells Addington, 3rd Viscount Sidmouth JP DL (25 March 1824 – 28 October 1913), was a British peer and politician.

Background
Sidmouth was the son of Reverend William Leonard Addington, 2nd Viscount Sidmouth, eldest son of Prime Minister Henry Addington, 1st Viscount Sidmouth.

Political career
Sidmouth was Member of Parliament for Devizes between 1863 and 1864.

Personal life
Lord Sidmouth died in October 1913, aged 89, and was succeeded in the viscountcy by his son, Gerald.

References

External links
 
 

1824 births
1913 deaths
3
Deputy Lieutenants of Devon
Members of the Parliament of the United Kingdom for English constituencies
UK MPs 1859–1865
UK MPs who inherited peerages